The Archdiocese of Monrovia (Archidioecesis Monroviensis) is the Roman Catholic Archdiocese in Monrovia, Liberia. It follows the Latin Rite. It was elevated to an archdiocese in December 1981. It was initially established as the Prefecture Apostolic of Liberia in 1903, being separated from the Apostolic Vicariate of Sierra Leone (which is now the Archdiocese of Freetown and Bo). Until Saturday, February 12, 2011, the Archdiocese of Monrovia had been headed by Michael Kpakala Francis, who had been Monrovia's Archbishop since its elevation in 1981, but Vatican Information Service (VIS) stated that he resigned that day for reasons of age and was succeeded immediately by his Coadjutor Archbishop, Lewis Jerome Zeigler (under canon law, each bishop must offer to resign when he turns 75, which may or may not be accepted then).

According to church statistics, the percentage of Catholics under the Archdiocese has risen to 8.2% of the total population in 2004 out of a total of approximately 1.6 million people.

The Diocese of Cape Palmas was created from it in 1981. The Diocese of Gbarnga was created from it in 1986.

Bishops

Ordinaries

Prefect Apostolic of Liberia
 Father Jean Ogé, SMA (3 January 1911 – 16 November 1931)
 Father John Collins, SMA (26 February 1932 – 9 April 1934); see below

Vicar Apostolic of Liberia
 John Collins, SMA (9 April 1934 – 2 February 1950); see above & below

Vicars Apostolic of Monrovia
 John Collins, SMA (2 February 1950 – 20 December 1960); see above
 Francis Carroll, SMA (20 December 1960 – 28 October 1976); concurrent with this, became nuncio in 1961 and titular archbishop in 1964
 Michael Kpakala Francis (28 October 1976 – 19 December 1981); see below

Archbishops of Monrovia
 Michael Kpakala Francis (19 December 1981 – 12 February 2011); see above
 Lewis Jerome Zeigler (12 February 2011 – 7 June 2021)

Coadjutor Archbishop
Lewis Jerome Zeigler (2009-2011)

Other priest of this diocese who became bishop
Lewis Jerome Zeigler (priest here, 1974–1986), appointed Bishop of Gbarnga in 2002; later returned here as Coadjutor

See also
List of Roman Catholic dioceses in Liberia
Stella Maris Polytechnic

Sources

 Archdiocese of Monrovia on catholichierarchy.org

Christian organizations established in 1903
Roman Catholic dioceses in Liberia
Archdiocese of Monrovia
Roman Catholic dioceses and prelatures established in the 20th century